ITC Roxy Mas, in Cideng in West Jakarta is a mall noted for its mobile phone business.

See also

List of shopping malls in Indonesia

References

Shopping malls in Jakarta
West Jakarta